The 2000 London mayoral election was held on 4 May 2000 to elect the Mayor of London. It was the first election to the office established that year; the idea of a London mayor of a Greater London Authority (GLA) had been included in Labour's 1997 election manifesto, and after their election a referendum in London was scheduled for May 1998, in which there was a 72% yes vote with a 34% turnout.

Electoral system
The election used a supplementary vote system, in which voters express a first and a second preference for candidates. 
 If a candidate receives more than 50% of the first preference vote, that candidate wins
 If no candidate receives more than 50% of first preference votes, the top two candidates proceed to a second round and all other candidates are eliminated
 The first preference votes for the remaining two candidates stand in the final count
 Voters' ballots whose first and second preference candidates have both been eliminated are discarded
 Voters whose first preference candidates have been eliminated and whose second preference candidate is one of the top two have their second preference votes added to that candidate's count
This means that the winning candidate has the support of a majority of voters who expressed a preference among the top two.

Results

Turnout: 1,752,303 (34.43%)
As the ballot papers are counted electronically, totals for all second preferences are available, even though some did not contribute to the final result.

Candidates
 Geoffrey Ben-Nathan stood as a PRO-MaSS (Pro-motorist and Small Shop) candidate, campaigning on a platform of stopping the use of motorists as "wallets on wheels".
 Geoffrey Clements ran for the Natural Law Party, of which he was the leader. A doctor of physics from the University of Sussex, he also trained as a teacher in the techniques of Maharishi Mahesh Yogi.
 Frank Dobson (born 15 March 1940), the Labour Party candidate, was the MP for Holborn and St. Pancras.
 Ram Gidoomal, a businessman and author originally from British East Africa ran for the Christian Peoples Alliance.
 Damian Hockney was a leading member of the UK Independence Party (UKIP). He has since been a member of Veritas and is now the leader of One London.
 Darren Johnson (born 1966) was a leading member of the Green Party of England and Wales who was elected to the London Assembly in 2000.
 Susan Kramer (born 22 July 1950) was the candidate for the Liberal Democrats. She was later elected MP for Richmond Park and is now a life peer.
 Ken Livingstone (born 17 June 1945) had been leader of the Greater London Council and MP for Brent East, both for the Labour Party.
 Michael Newland was the candidate for the British National Party, at the time serving as the party's national treasurer. Previously associated with the National Front he subsequently joined the Freedom Party.
 Steven Norris (born 24 May 1945) had served the Conservative Party as MP for Oxford East and Epping Forest.
 Ashwinkumar Tanna, who had been a candidate for UKIP in the 2000 Tottenham by-election, ran on an independent ticket with a range of policies including opposing privatisation of London Underground, local involvement in policing and the establishment of a citywide business forum.

Candidate selection

Labour

With the first mayoral election scheduled for May 2000, Ken Livingstone stated his intention to stand as a potential Labour candidate for the position in March 1998. Tony Blair did not want Livingstone as London Mayor, claiming the latter was one of those who "almost knocked [the party] over the edge of the cliff into extinction" during the 1980s. He and the Labour spin doctors organised a campaign against Livingstone to ensure that he was not selected, with Campbell and Sally Morgan unsuccessfully attempting to get Oona King to denounce Livingstone. They failed to convince Mo Mowlam to stand for the mayorship, and instead encouraged the reluctant Frank Dobson to stand. Recognising that a 'one member, one vote' election within the London Labour Party would probably see Livingstone selected over Dobson, Blair ensured that a third of the votes would come from the rank-and-file members, a third from the trades unions, and a third from Labour MPs and MEPs, the latter two of which he could pressure into voting for his own preferred candidate, something that Dobson was deeply uncomfortable with.

Information on the Blairite campaign against Livingstone became public, costing Dobson much support; nevertheless, while Livingstone won amongst party members (60% to Dobson's 40%) and among affiliated unions (72% to Dobson's 28%, a more than 2:1 vote), Dobson's landslide victory (173:27 in ratio) amongst MPs, MEPS and GLA candidates saw him win narrowly overall: forming a simple electoral college outcome of 51.5% to 48.5%. Livingstone proclaimed Dobson to be "a tainted candidate" and stated his intention to run for the Mayoralty as an independent candidate. Aware that this would result in his expulsion from Labour, he publicly stated that "I have been forced to choose between the party I love and upholding the democratic rights of Londoners."

Conservatives
Steve Norris had lost the original selection ballot for Conservative candidate to Jeffrey Archer, but Archer stood down as a candidate when a newspaper printed a story accusing him of committing perjury during a 1987 libel trial (he was later convicted and imprisoned).

References

External links
 Results by GLA constituency

2000
2000 English local elections
Mayoral election
May 2000 events in the United Kingdom
Ken Livingstone